Unregenerate may refer to 

Unregenerate!, Doctor Who audio play
In Christian theology, 
A person who has not undergone regeneration
A synonym for infidel